Givira carisca is a moth in the family Cossidae. It is found in Mexico.

The wingspan is about 23 mm. The forewings are whitish with a cluster of large dark brown spots at the base, separated by veins. The hindwings are greyish white.

References

Moths described in 1901
Givira